Ottaviano Menni was an Italian mathematician and mestre de camp who lived between the 17th and 18th centuries.

Works

References 

17th-century births
18th-century deaths
17th-century Italian mathematicians
18th-century Italian mathematicians